Adam White (29 April 1817 – 30 December 1878) was a Scottish zoologist.

Biography

White was born in Edinburgh on 29 April 1817. He became acquainted with John Edward Gray, Keeper of Zoology at the British Museum. At the age of eighteen, White obtained a post in the Museum in the Zoology Department. In 1841 he was given the task of identifying and publishing the spiders collected by Charles Darwin on the Voyage of the Beagle and "preserved in spirits of wine, as spiders should always be if possible".  This work was published as Description of new or little known Arachnida.

White specialised in insects and crustaceans, writing the List of the Specimens of Crustacea in the British Museum (1847) and A Popular History of Mammalia (1850). White was a member of the Entomological Society of London from 1839 to 1863, and a Fellow of the Linnean Society from 1846 to 1855.

White suffered a nervous breakdown after the death of his first wife in 1861. He remarried in 1862, and had at least three children by his second wife. He died intestate in Pollokshields on 30 December 1878.

Species named in White's honour
John Obadiah Westwood named the insect species Taphroderes whitii in White's honour, after White pointed a specimen of that same insect out to Westwood during a visit to the British Museum.

Selected works

References

Further reading

External links
 
 
 
 Testimonials of Adam White

1817 births
1878 deaths
Scottish zoologists
Scottish entomologists
British carcinologists
Scottish lepidopterists
Employees of the Natural History Museum, London
Fellows of the Linnean Society of London
Scientists from Edinburgh